The Book of Lies may refer to:

 The Book of Lies (Crowley), a 1913 title by Aleister Crowley
 The Book of Lies (Picano novel), a 1999 title by Felice Picano
 The Book of Lies: The Disinformation Guide to Magick and the Occult, a 2003 compilation edited by Richard Metzger
 The Book of Lies (Moloney novel), a 2004 title by James Moloney
 The Book of Lies (Meltzer novel), a 2008 title by Brad Meltzer
 Book of Lies (album), a 2008 recording by Australian band End of Fashion
 The Book of Lies (Horlock novel), a 2011 title by Mary Horlock